Purple Knights may refer to:

 Bridgeport Purple Knights, athletic teams that represent the University of Bridgeport, in Bridgeport, Connecticut, U.S.
 Saint Michael's Purple Knights, athletic teams that represent Saint Michael's College, in Colchester, Vermont, U.S.
 Purple Knights, athletic teams that represent Moncton High School, in Moncton, New Brunswick, Canada
 Purple Knights, athletic teams that represent Beloit Memorial High School, in Beloit, Wisconsin, U.S.